Reeves Névé is an extensive névé lying westward of the Eisenhower Range in Victoria Land. Reeves Glacier, which drains southeastward to the coast, has its source in this névé. It was named by the New Zealand Antarctic Place-Names Committee in association with Reeves Glacier.

References

Snow fields of Victoria Land
Scott Coast
Névés of Antarctica